The 1988 Bausch & Lomb Championships was a women's tennis tournament played on outdoor clay courts at the Amelia Island Plantation on Amelia Island, Florida in the United States and was part of  the Category 5 tier of the 1988 WTA Tour. The tournament ran from April 11 through April 17, 1988. second-seeded Martina Navratilova won the singles title.

Finals

Singles

 Martina Navratilova defeated  Gabriela Sabatini 6–0, 6–2 
 It was Navratilova's 5th singles title of the year and the 134rd of her career.

Doubles

 Zina Garrison /  Eva Pfaff defeated  Katrina Adams /  Penny Barg 4–6, 6–2, 7–6(7–5)
 It was Garrison's 2nd title of the year and the 12th of her career. It was Pfaff's 2nd title of the year and the 6th of her career.

References

External links
 ITF tournament edition details

Bausch and Lomb Championships
Amelia Island Championships
Bausch and Lomb Championships
Bausch and Lomb Championships
Bausch and Lomb Championships